Francis Grignon (born 3 January 1944) is a French politician and a former member of the Senate of France. He represented the Bas-Rhin department and is a member of the Union for a Popular Movement Party.

References
Page on the Senate website 

1944 births
Living people
French Senators of the Fifth Republic
Union for a Popular Movement politicians
Senators of Bas-Rhin
Place of birth missing (living people)